Simp'o-ri station is a railway station in Simp'o-ri, Unhŭng county, Ryanggang province, North Korea, on the Paektusan Ch'ŏngnyŏn Line of the Korean State Railway.

The station, along with the rest of the Pongdu-ri–Hyesanjin section, was opened by the Government Railways of Chosen(朝鮮総督府鉄道) on 1 November 1937.

On 9 October 2006 an underground nuclear test was conducted at P'unggye-ri in Kilju County, causing the closure of the line for 3–4 months.

Talc, kaolin and magnesite are shipped from here.

References

Railway stations in North Korea